Zabit Samedov (born July 21, 1984) is an Azerbaijani kickboxer and muay thai fighter. He is the 2012 K-1 World Grand Prix Finalist, when he lost to Badr Hari in the quarter-finals by unanimous decisions. Samedov is also a former It's Showtime 95MAX World Championship challenger.

As of July 2021, he is ranked the #5 heavyweight in the world by Combat Press.

Early life
Zabit Samedov was born in Georgia into an Azerbaijani family and moved to Minsk when he was 10 years old. He started practicing martial arts at the age of 9. At very first he studied karate for 6 months under Aziz Dursunov, then switched to Muay Thai. In 1998, he joined Chinuk Gym, a well known gym based in Minsk. He trained with Alexey Ignashov and Sergei Gur under the management of his trainer Dmitriy Pyasetsky.

Martial arts career

K-1 & It's Showtime
He was recruited by top martial arts organization K-1 after achieving several titles in various events between 2004 and 2006. He began to fight with consistency by attaining the title of K-1 Fighting Network in Riga in 2006 in Latvia.

On August 17, 2007, following the K-1 World GP 2007 in Las Vegas event the Nevada State Athletic Commission (NSAC) issued a statement that Samedov tested positive for Stanozolol, an anabolic steroid.

On 26 April 2008, Samedov competed in K-1 World Grand Prix 2008 in Amsterdam, dispatched Doug Viney and Brian Douwes respectively. However, he was beaten by Errol Zimmerman in the final on points.

On November 29, 2008, Samedov faced Tyrone Spong for the inaugural It's Showtime 95MAX World title, and lost by unanimous decision.

Samedov fought at the K-1 World Grand Prix 2009 in Łódź where he beat, Mindaugas Sakalauskas by unanimous decision and Raul Cătinaș and Sergei Lascenko to finally make it to the Final 16. At the K-1 World Grand Prix 2009 Final 16 Samedov was knocked out by Badr Hari in the first round. He's now set to fight Igor Jurković on United Glory 15.

He faced Xavier Vigney at the K-1 World Grand Prix 2012 in Tokyo Final 16 on October 14, 2012 and totally outclassed the young American, flooring him three times in the first round to win via TKO.

He was scheduled to face Andrei Stoica for the inaugural SUPERKOMBAT Super Cruiserweight Championship at the SUPERKOMBAT World Grand Prix 2012 Final in Bucharest, Romania on December 22 but pulled out due to illness.

At the K-1 World Grand Prix 2012 Final on March 15, 2013, in Zagreb, Croatia, he was originally drawn against Ben Edwards in the quarter-finals. However, Edwards withdrew due to having a fight booked with Paul Slowinski a week later, and was replaced by Badr Hari. Samedov was knocked down in round one and received a standing eight count in three, losing a unanimous decision.

SUPERKOMBAT Fighting Championship
Samedov scored a first round high kick KO over Wiesław Kwaśniewski at SUPERKOMBAT New Heroes 3 in Vienna, Austria on May 10, 2013.

LEGEND
A third fight with Badr Hari took place at Legend 1 in Moscow, Russia on May 25, 2013. Samedov dropped Hari late in round one, and sent him to the canvas again with a left hook in the second. Although Hari seemed lucid, he stayed on his knees and did not beat the count, giving Samedov the KO victory.

He competed in the -93 kg/205 lb tournament at Legend 2: Invasion in Moscow, Russia on November 9, 2013, taking a unanimous decision over Melvin Manhoef in the semi-finals. He was set to fight Pavel Zhuravlev in the final but was unable to do so due to a cut and was replaced by Agron Preteni.

Returning to the ring for the first time in eight months, Samedov scored a 21-second high kick knockout over Stefan Leko on the undercard of the Ruslan Chagaev vs. Fres Oquendo boxing match in Grozny, Russia on July 6, 2014.

Global FC
He won three more fights, defeating Jafar Ahmadi, Makoto Uehara and Mert Akın by decision.

Samedov took part in the GFC Fight Series 3 tournament. He beat Steve McKinnon by decision in the semifinals, and Danyo Ilunga by an extra round decision in the finals.

Russia
In the latter part of 2015, Samedov signed with Akhmat Fight Show, and fought almost exclusively for them over the next three years. In his organizational debut, he was scheduled to fight Dževad Poturak, whom he beat by unanimous decision. Four months later, he beat Paul Slowinski in the same manner.

In his third fight with the organization, Samedov was scheduled to fight Cătălin Moroșanu for the WBC Muaythai World Heavywheight Championship. He knocked Moroșanu out in the first round, with a knee strike.

Over the next two years, Samedov fought five more times: he scored stoppage wins over Evgeny Orlov and Frédéric Sinistra, and decision wins against Errol Zimmerman, Freddy Kemayo and Brice Guidon.

Following a 26-month hiatus from the sport, Samedov was scheduled to fight James McSweeney at the Mix Fight Championship on April 11, 2020. The fight was later cancelled due to the COVID-19 pandemic.

Semedov made his comeback against Deji Kalejaiye, after a two and a half year hiatus, at the WTKF Belarus event. He won the fight by a second-round TKO.

Semedov faced Didier Kilola Lubika on October 4, 2021, at ACA 130: Dudaev vs. Praia. He won the bout via TKO in the second round.

Failed drug test
In 2009, Samedov accused Badr Hari and Errol Zimmerman of steroid use during their fights. His claims were supported by Ruslan Karaev. In 2019, Hari was revealed to have failed a drug test by the Doping Authority Netherlands (DAN). Samedov himself tested positive for an anabolic steroid following the K-1 World Grand Prix 2007 in Las Vegas.

Personal life
On October 6, 2020, during the 2020 Nagorno-Karabakh war Samedov voluntarily joined the Azeri military. He is also known for his appearance as a character called 'Gence Bey' in the Turkish TV series, Kuruluş: Osman.

Titles
International Sport Karate Association
 2022 ISKA K-1 World Heavyweight Champion
World Boxing Council Muaythai
 2016 WBC Muaythai World Heavywheight Champion -104.50 kg
Global Fighting Championship
 2015 GFC Fight Series 3 Heavyweight Tournament Champion
K-1
 K-1 World Grand Prix 2009 in Łódź champion
 2008 K-1 Europe GP runner-up
 2007 K-1 World Grand Prix in Las Vegas runner up
 2007 K-1 Rules Kick Tournament in Marseilles champion
 2006 K-1 Fighting Network in Riga champion
 2006 K-1 Hungary champion
KOK
 KOK European Heavyweight Champion
International Federation of Muaythai Amateur
 2006 IFMA World Amateur Muay Thai Championship Winner in Thailand
 2001 IFMA European Muay Thai champion
World Muaythai Federation
 2006 WMF World Amateur Muay Thai Championship Winner in Thailand
World BARS Kickboxing Federation
 2004 WBKF European Kickboxing champion
 2002 WBKF BARS Gold Cup Kickboxing champion
World Association of Kickboxing Organizations
 2004 WAKO Thaiboxing World champion in Ukraine
 2000 WAKO Thaiboxing World Cup champion
Kristall Cup
 2003 "Kristall Cup" Kickboxing runner-up
 2002 "Kristall Cup" Kickboxing champion

Fight record

|- style="background:#cfc;"
| 2022-09-10 || Win ||align=left| Antônio Silva || Mix Fight Championship || Baku, Azerbaijan || TKO (Ref.stop./Punches) || 1 || 2:07 
|-
! style=background:white colspan=9 |
|-  bgcolor="#CCFFCC"
| 2021-10-04|| Win||align=left| Didier Kilola Lubika || ACA 130: Dudaev vs. Praia || Grozny, Russia || TKO (Leg Kicks) || 2|| 1:12
|-  bgcolor="#CCFFCC"
| 2021-06-14|| Win||align=left| Deji Kalejaiye || WTKF - M1 Fight Night || Highway, Belarus || TKO (Referee Stoppage) || 2||
|-  bgcolor="#CCFFCC"
| 2018-12-02|| Win||align=left| Evgeny Orlov || Akhmat Fight Show ||  Belarus || TKO (Right low kicks) || 3 || 0:28
|-  bgcolor="#CCFFCC"
| 2018-08-16 || Win||align=left| Brice Guidon || Akhmat Fight Show || Grozny, Russia || Decision (Unanimous) || 3 || 3:00
|-  bgcolor="#CCFFCC"
| 2018-05-30 || Win||align=left| Freddy Kemayo || Zhara Fight Show || Moscow, Russia || Decision (Unanimous) || 5 || 2:00
|-
! style=background:white colspan=9 |
|-
|-  bgcolor="#CCFFCC"
| 2017-08-23 || Win || align=left| Errol Zimmerman|| Akhmat Fight Show || Grozny, Russia || Decision (Unanimous) || 3 || 3:00
|-  bgcolor="#CCFFCC"
| 2017-05-13 || Win || align=left| Frédéric Sinistra|| Akin Dovus Arenasi || Istanbul, Turkey || TKO (Leg injury) || 2 || 1:17
|-  bgcolor="#CCFFCC"
| 2016-08-23 || Win || align=left| Cătălin Moroșanu|| Akhmat Fight Show || Grozny, Russia || KO (Right knee) || 1 || 1:13
|-
! style=background:white colspan=9 |
|-
|-  bgcolor="#CCFFCC"
| 2015-12-26 || Win || align=left| Paul Slowinski|| Akhmat Fight Show || Grozny, Russia || Decision (Unanimous) || 3 || 3:00  
|-
|-  bgcolor="#CCFFCC"
| 2015-08-22 || Win ||align=left| Dževad Poturak || Akhmat Fight Show || Grozny, Russia || Decision (Unanimous) || 3 || 3:00  
|-
|-  bgcolor="#CCFFCC"
| 2015-04-17 || Win ||align=left| Danyo Ilunga || GFC Fight Series 3 - Heavyweight Tournament, Final || Dubai, UAE || Ext.R Decision (Unanimous) || 4 || 3:00
|-
! style=background:white colspan=9 |
|-
|-  bgcolor="#CCFFCC"
| 2015-04-17 || Win ||align=left| Steve McKinnon || GFC Fight Series 3 - Heavyweight Tournament, Semi Finals || Dubai, UAE || Decision (Unanimous) || 3 || 3:00
|-
|-  bgcolor="#CCFFCC"
| 2015-02-28 || Win ||align=left| Mert Akın || Akın Dövüş Arenası || İstanbul, Turkey ||Decision (Unanimous)  || 3 || 3:00
|-  bgcolor="#CCFFCC"
| 2014-12-29 || Win ||align=left| Makoto Uehara || Blade 1 || Tokyo, Japan || Extra Round Decision || 4 || 3:00
|-
|-  bgcolor="#CCFFCC"
| 2014-10-16 ||Win ||align=left| Jafar Ahmadi || GFC Fight Series 2 || Dubai, UAE ||Decision (Unanimous) || 3 || 3:00
|-
|-  bgcolor="#CCFFCC"
| 2014-07-06 || Win ||align=left| Stefan Leko || Chagaev vs. Oquendo || Grozny, Russia || KO (Left high kick) || 1 || 0:21
|-
|-  bgcolor="#CCFFCC"
| 2013-11-09 ||Win ||align=left| Melvin Manhoef || Legend 2: Invasion, Semi Finals || Moscow, Russia || Decision (Unanimous) || 3 || 3:00
|-
! style=background:white colspan=9 |
|-
|-  bgcolor="#CCFFCC"
| 2013-09-22 || Win ||align=left| Dragan Jovanović || Heydar Aliyev Cup 2013 || Baku, Azerbaijan || Decision (Split) || 3 || 3:00
|-
|-  bgcolor="#CCFFCC"
| 2013-05-25 || Win ||align=left| Badr Hari || Legend 1 || Moscow, Russia || KO (Left hook) || 2 || 2:16
|-
|-  bgcolor="#CCFFCC"
| 2013-05-10 || Win ||align=left| Wiesław Kwaśniewski || SUPERKOMBAT New Heroes 3 || Vienna, Austria || KO (High kick) || 1 || 1:53
|-  bgcolor="#FFBBBB"
| 2013-03-15 || Loss ||align=left| Badr Hari || K-1 World Grand Prix 2012 Final, Quarter Finals || Zagreb, Croatia || Decision (Unanimous) || 3 || 3:00
|-  bgcolor="#CCFFCC"
| 2012-10-14 || Win ||align=left| Xavier Vigney || K-1 World Grand Prix 2012 in Tokyo Final 16, First Round || Tokyo, Japan || TKO (Corner stoppage) || 1 || 1:47
|-  bgcolor="#CCFFCC"
| 2012-03-23 || Win ||align=left| Igor Jurković || United Glory 15 || Moscow, Russia || Decision (Unanimous) || 3 || 3:00
|-  bgcolor="#CCFFCC"
| 2011-09-10 ||Win ||align=left| Vjekoslav Bajic || Battle Show» 2011 || Minsk, Belarus || Decision (Unanimous)|| 3 ||3:00
|-  bgcolor="#c5d2ea"
| 2011-05-28 || Draw ||align=left| Ali Cenik || United Glory 14: 2010-2011 World Series Finals || Moscow, Russia || Draw || 3 || 3:00
|-  bgcolor="#CCFFCC"
| 2010-12-29 || Win ||align=left| Dmytro Bezus || RMO 2010  || Istanbul, Turkey || Ext. R. Decision || 4 || 3:00
|-  bgcolor="#CCFFCC"
| 2010-05-22 ||Win ||align=left| Alexander Novovic || APF - Azerbaijan vs. Europe || Baku, Azerbaijan || KO (Right hook) || 2 ||1:25 
|-  bgcolor="#CCFFCC"
| 2010-03-19 ||Win ||align=left| Rodney Glunder || K-1 World MAX 2010 East Europe Tournament || Minsk, Belarus ||KO (Right cross) || 3 ||1:48 
|-  bgcolor="#CCFFCC"
| 2010-03-19 ||Win ||align=left| Anatolie Morărescu || K-1 World MAX 2010 East Europe Tournament || Minsk, Belarus || KO (Left hook) || 1 ||2:16 
|-  bgcolor="#CCFFCC"
| 2009-11-14 || Win ||align=left| Mindaugas Sakalauskas || Hero's Lithuania 2009 || Vilnius, Lithuania || Decision (Unanimous) || 3 || 3:00
|-  bgcolor="#FFBBBB"
| 2009-09-26 || Loss||align=left| Badr Hari || K-1 World Grand Prix 2009 Final 16, First Round || Seoul, Republic of Korea || KO (Right body shot) || 1 || 2:15
|-  bgcolor="#CCFFCC"
| 2009-05-23 || Win ||align=left| Sergei Lascenko || K-1 World Grand Prix 2009 in Łódź || Łódź, Poland || TKO (Low kicks) || 3 || 2:05
|-
! style=background:white colspan=9 |
|-
|-  bgcolor="#CCFFCC"
| 2009-05-23 || Win ||align=left| Raul Cătinaș || K-1 World Grand Prix 2009 in Łódź || Łódź, Poland || Decision (Unanimous) || 3 || 3:00
|-  bgcolor="#CCFFCC"
| 2009-05-23 || Win ||align=left| Mindaugas Sakalauskas || K-1 World Grand Prix 2009 in Łódź || Łódź, Poland || Ext. R Decision (Unanimous) || 4 || 3:00
|-  bgcolor="#CCFFCC"
| 2009-02-27 || Win ||align=left| Konstantin Gluhov || K-1 Professional International tournament || Baku, Azerbaijan || Decision (Unanimous) || 3 || 3:00
|-  bgcolor="#FFBBBB"
| 2008-11-29 || Loss ||align=left| Tyrone Spong || It's Showtime 2008 Eindhoven || Eindhoven, Netherlands || Decision (Unanimous) || 5 || 3:00
|-
! style=background:white colspan=9 |
|-
|-  bgcolor="#CCFFCC"
| 2008-09-27 || Win ||align=left| Fabiano da Silva || K-1 World GP 2008 Final 16, Super Fight || Seoul, Republic of Korea || Decision (Unanimous) || 3 || 3:00
|-  bgcolor="#CCFFCC"
| 2008-09-12 || Win ||align=left| Luboš Šuda || K-1 Slovakia 2008 || Bratislava, Slovakia || TKO (Referee stoppage) || 3 || 1:29
|-  bgcolor="#CCFFCC"
| 2008-07-13 || Win ||align=left| Ray Sefo || K-1 World GP 2008 in Taipei || Taipei City, Taiwan || 2 Ext.R Decision (Split) || 5 || 3:00
|-  bgcolor="#CCFFCC"
| 2008-06-06 || Win ||align=left| Sebastian Ciobanu || Local Kombat 30 || Timișoara, Romania || Ext.R Decision || 4 || 3:00
|-  bgcolor="#FFBBBB"
| 2008-04-26 || Loss ||align=left| Errol Zimmerman || K-1 World GP 2008 in Amsterdam || Amsterdam, Netherlands || Decision (Majority) || 3 || 3:00
|-
! style=background:white colspan=9 |
|-
|-  bgcolor="#CCFFCC"
| 2008-04-26 || Win ||align=left| Brian Douwes || K-1 World GP 2008 in Amsterdam || Amsterdam, Netherlands || Ext.R Decision (Unanimous) || 4 || 3:00
|-  bgcolor="#CCFFCC"
| 2008-04-26 || Win ||align=left| Doug Viney || K-1 World GP 2008 in Amsterdam || Amsterdam, Netherlands || Decision (Unanimous) || 3 || 3:00
|-  bgcolor="#CCFFCC"
| 2008-02-09 || Win ||align=left| Vitor Miranda || K-1 World GP 2008 in Budapest || Budapest, Hungary || Decision (Majority) || 3 || 3:00
|-  bgcolor="#CCFFCC"
| 2007-11-02 || Win ||align=left| David Dancrade || K-1 Fighting Network Turkey 2007 || Istanbul, Turkey || 2 Ext.R Decision (Unanimous)|| 5 || 3:00
|-  bgcolor="#CCFFCC"
| 2007-10-13 || Win ||align=left| Luca Sabatini || K-1 Fighting Network Latvia 2007 || Riga, Latvia || KO (Left cross) || 1 || N/A 
|-  bgcolor="#FFBBBB"
| 2007-08-11 || Loss ||align=left| Doug Viney || K-1 World Grand Prix 2007 in Las Vegas || Las Vegas, Nevada, United States || Decision (Unanimous) || 3 || 3:00
|-
! style=background:white colspan=9 |
|-
|-  bgcolor="#CCFFCC"
| 2007-08-11 || Win ||align=left| Patrick Barry || K-1 World Grand Prix 2007 in Las Vegas || Las Vegas, Nevada, United States || Decision (Split) || 3 || 3:00
|-  bgcolor="#CCFFCC"
| 2007-08-11 || Win ||align=left| Esh'Chadar Brown Ton || K-1 World Grand Prix 2007 in Las Vegas || Las Vegas, Nevada, United States || KO (Spinning back kick) || 2 || 1:05
|-  bgcolor="#FFBBBB"
| 2007-06-23 || Loss ||align=left| Paul Slowinski || K-1 World GP 2007 in Amsterdam || Amsterdam, Netherlands || TKO (Low kicks) || 1 || 2:47
|-  bgcolor="#CCFFCC"
| 2007-06-23 || Win ||align=left| James Phillips || K-1 World GP 2007 in Amsterdam || Amsterdam, Netherlands || Decision || 3 || 3:00
|-  bgcolor="#CCFFCC"
| 2007-04-14 || Win ||align=left| Kevin Klinger || K-1 Gladiators 2007 in Estonia || Tallinn, Estonia || Decision || 3 || 3:00
|-  bgcolor="#CCFFCC"
| 2007-03-04 || Win ||align=left| Tsuyoshi Nakasako || K-1 World GP 2007 in Yokohama || Yokohama, Japan || Decision || 3 || 3:00
|-  bgcolor="#CCFFCC"
| 2007-01-26 || Win ||align=left| Gregory Tony || K-1 Rules Kick Tournament 2007 in Marseilles || Marseilles, France || KO (Right hook) || 3 || 2:30
|-
! style=background:white colspan=9 |
|-
|-  bgcolor="#CCFFCC"
| 2007-01-26 || Win ||align=left| Karl Dubus || K-1 Rules Kick Tournament 2007 in Marseilles || Marseilles, France || Decision || 3 || 3:00
|-  bgcolor="#CCFFCC"
| 2007-01-26 || Win ||align=left| Aurel Bococi || K-1 Rules Kick Tournament 2007 in Marseilles || Marseilles, France || Decision || 3 || 3:00
|-  bgcolor="#CCFFCC"
| 2007-01-13 || Win ||align=left| Daniel Lentie || K-1 Rules Heavyweight Tournament 2007 in Turkey || Istanbul, Turkey ||Ext.R Decision || 4 || 3:00
|-  bgcolor="#CCFFCC"
| 2006-12-16 || Win ||align=left| Michael McDonald || K-1 Fighting Network Prague Round '07 || Prague, Czech Republic || TKO || 3 || N/A
|-  bgcolor="#CCFFCC"
| 2006-11-04 || Win ||align=left| Maxim Neledva || K-1 Fighting Network Riga 2006 || Riga, Latvia || Decision (Split) || 3 || 3:00
|-
! style=background:white colspan=9 |
|-
|-  bgcolor="#CCFFCC"
| 2006-11-04 || Win ||align=left| Mariusz Kornacki || K-1 Fighting Network Riga 2006 || Riga, Latvia || TKO || 1 || 2:42
|-  bgcolor="#CCFFCC"
| 2006-11-04 || Win ||align=left| Konstantin Uriadov || K-1 Fighting Network Riga 2006 || Riga, Latvia || KO || 2 || 2:59
|-  bgcolor="#CCFFCC"
| 2006-08-18 || Win ||align=left| Marko Tomasović || K-1 Hungary 2006 || Debrecen, Hungary || KO || 1 || N/A
|-
! style=background:white colspan=9 |
|-
|-  bgcolor="#CCFFCC"
| 2006-08-18 || Win ||align=left| Zsolt Bertalan || K-1 Hungary 2006 || Debrecen, Hungary || KO || 2 || N/A 
|-  bgcolor="#CCFFCC"
| 2006-08-18 || Win ||align=left| Peter Varga || K-1 Hungary 2006 || Debrecen, Hungary || Decision (Unanimous) || 3 || 3:00

|-  bgcolor="#CCFFCC"
| 2006-02-22 || Win ||align=left| Gamzat Islamagamedov || WBKF European Muay Thai title, (-93 kg) || Moscow, Russia || KO || 3 || N/A
|-  bgcolor="#CCFFCC"
| 2005-09-28 || Win ||align=left| Maxim Neledva || WBKF European Muay Thai title (93 kg) || Moscow, Russia || Decision || 5 || 3:00
|-  bgcolor="#CCFFCC"
| 2005-07-13 || Win ||align=left| Alexey Kudin || Fight Club Arbat || Moscow, Russia || TKO || 4 || N/A
|-  bgcolor="#CCFFCC"
| 2005-05-09 || Win ||align=left| Sergei Matkin || Ufa || Russia || Decision || 5 || 3:00
|-  bgcolor="#CCFFCC"
| 2005-03-30 || Win ||align=left| Ruslan Baklanov || Fight Club Arbat || Moscow, Russia || KO || 5 || N/A 
|-  bgcolor="#CCFFCC"
| 2005-02-22 || Win ||align=left| Magomed Kamilov || Ufa || Russia || KO || 2 || N/A 
|-  bgcolor="#CCFFCC"
| 2005-01-26 || Win ||align=left| Salim Abakarov || Fight Club Arbat (86 kg) || Moscow, Russia || TKO || 5 || N/A
|-  bgcolor="#CCFFCC"
| 2004-11-13 || Win ||align=left| Topi Helin || Fight Festival 12 || Finland || Decision (Split) || 5 || 3:00
|-  bgcolor="#CCFFCC"
| 2004-04-28 || Win ||align=left| Gamzat Islamagamedov || WBKF European Muay Thai title (-81 kg) || Moscow, Russia || Decision || 5 || 3:00
|-  bgcolor="#FFBBBB"
| 2003-12-29 || Loss ||align=left| Magomed Magomedov || WBKF Golden Panther Cup Finals (81 kg) @ Club Arbat || Moscow, Russia || Decision (Split) || 8 || 2:00
|-
! style=background:white colspan=9 |
|-
|-  bgcolor="#CCFFCC"
| 2003-11-19 || Win ||align=left| Ubaydulla Chopolayev || WBKF Golden Panther Cup 1/2 finals (81 kg) @ Club Arbat || Moscow, Russia || Decision (Unanimous) || 5 || 2:00
|-  bgcolor="#CCFFCC"
| 2003-11-19 || Win ||align=left| Vitaly Shemetov || WBKF Golden Panther Cup 1/4 finals (81 kg) @ Club Arbat || Moscow, Russia || Decision (Unanimous) || 3 || 3:00
|-  bgcolor="#CCFFCC"
| 2003-08-14 || Win ||align=left| Habib Gadjiev || Kristall Cup final (76 kg) || Moscow, Russia || Decision || 5 || 3:00
|-
! style=background:white colspan=9 |
|-
|-  bgcolor="#CCFFCC"
| 2003-08-14 || Win ||align=left| Alexey Kharkevich || Kristall Cup 1/2 finals (76 kg) || Moscow, Russia || Decision || 5 || 3:00
|-  bgcolor="#FFBBBB"
| 2003-05-28 || Loss ||align=left| Magomed Kamilov || BARS "Arbat" || Moscow, Russia || Decision || 5 || 3:00
|-  bgcolor="#FFBBBB"
| 2003-03-19 || Loss ||align=left| Dmitry Shakuta || BARS - Cup of Arbat Final || Moscow, Russia || Decision || 5 || 3:00
|-
! style=background:white colspan=9 |
|-
|-  bgcolor="#CCFFCC"
| 2003-03-12 || Win ||align=left| Kanatbek Sydygaliyev || BARS - Cup of Arbat Semifinals || Moscow, Russia || Decision (Majority) || 5 || 3:00
|-  bgcolor="#CCFFCC"
| 2003-03-06 || Win ||align=left| Aleksandr Shlakunov || BARS - Cup of Arbat Quarterfinals || Moscow, Russia || Decision || 5 || 3:00
|-  bgcolor="#CCFFCC"
| 2003-01-29 || Win ||align=left| Pavel Boloyangov || BARS - Cup of Arbat || Moscow, Russia || ТKO || 3 || N/A
|-  bgcolor="#CCFFCC"
| 2002-09-18 || Win ||align=left| Abdula Gusniyev || BARS - Cup of Arbat Final || Moscow, Russia || Decision (Split) || 5 || 3:00
|-
! style=background:white colspan=9 |
|-
|-  bgcolor="#CCFFCC"
| 2002-09-12 || Win ||align=left| Khabib Ghadzhiyev || BARS - Cup of Arbat Semifinals || Moscow, Russia || Decision (Split) || 5 || 3:00
|-  bgcolor="#CCFFCC"
| 2002-09-04 || Win ||align=left| Vladimir Todorov || BARS - Cup of Arbat Quarterfinals || Moscow, Russia || Decision (Split) || 5 || 3:00
|-  bgcolor="#CCFFCC"
| 2002-02-20 || Win ||align=left| Anderi Negriy || N/A || Moscow, Russia || Decision || 5 || 2:00
|-  bgcolor="#CCFFCC"
| 2001-12-01 || Win ||align=left| Igor Berezuk || BARS - Cup of Arbat || Moscow, Russia || Decision || 3 || 3:00
|-  bgcolor="#CCFFCC"
| 2001-05-29 || Win ||align=left| Sergey Ikrennikov || Fight Club Arbat || Moscow, Russia || TKO || 1 || N/A
|-  bgcolor="#CCFFCC"
| 2001-05-08 || Win ||align=left| Andrei Gazarov || Fight Club Arbat || Moscow, Russia || KO || 5 || N/A
|-
| colspan=9 | Legend:    

|-  bgcolor="#CCFFCC"
| 2006-06-07 || Win ||align=left| Vjacheslav Migolatjev || IFMA World Amateur Muay Thai Championship final || Bangkok, Thailand || N/A || N/A || N/A
|-
! style=background:white colspan=9 |
|-
|-  bgcolor="#CCFFCC"
| 2006-06-06 || Win ||align=left| Harold Olsen || IFMA World Amateur Muay Thai Championship 1/2 finals || Bangkok, Thailand || N/A || N/A || N/A 
|-  bgcolor="#CCFFCC"
| 2006-06-03 || Win ||align=left| Pedram Toultan || IFMA World Amateur Muay Thai Championship 1/4 finals || Bangkok, Thailand || TKO (Referee stoppage) || 2 || N/A
|-  bgcolor="#CCFFCC"
| 2006-03-26 || Win ||align=left| Maksim Vinogradov || WMF World Amateur Muay Thai Championship Finals || Bangkok, Thailand || Decision || 5 || 3:00
|-
! style=background:white colspan=9 |
|-
|-  bgcolor="#CCFFCC"
| 2006-03-24 || Win ||align=left| Erhan Deniz || WMF World Amateur Muay Thai Championship 1/2 Finals || Bangkok, Thailand || Decision || 5 || 3:00
|-
| colspan=9 | Legend:

Mixed martial arts record

|Win
|align=center|2–0
|Vitali Oparin
|KO (spinning back kick)
|Russian MMA Championship
|June 1, 2012
|align=center|1
|align=center|N/A
|Saint Petersburg, Russia
|
|-
|Win
|align=center|1–0
|Yuri Gorbenko
|TKO (retirement)
|RF - Real Fight-FC
|March 25, 2011
|align=center|1
|align=center|5:00
|Minsk, Belarus
|
|-

See also
List of K-1 events
List of K-1 champions
List of male kickboxers

References

External links

Official website Zabit Samedov
Profile at K-1

Azerbaijani male kickboxers
Heavyweight kickboxers
Azerbaijani male mixed martial artists
Mixed martial artists utilizing Muay Thai
Azerbaijani Muay Thai practitioners
1984 births
Living people
Georgian Azerbaijanis
People from Kvemo Kartli
SUPERKOMBAT kickboxers
Doping cases in kickboxing
Azerbaijani sportspeople in doping cases
King of Kings champions